The Vienna Institute of Demography (VID) (until 2002: Institut für Demographie/IfD) is a research institute of the division for humanities and social sciences within the Austrian Academy of Sciences (ÖAW) and part of the three "pillar institutions" of the Wittgenstein Centre for Demography and Global Human Capital.

History 

After some groundwork by researchers interested in having a population studies institute in Austria, among them Wilhelm Winkler and Gustav Feichtinger, the Institut für Demographie was established in November 1975 as a non-university research institute of the Austrian Academy of Sciences in close cooperation with the Austrian Statistical Central Office (now Statistik Austria). Founding director was Lothar Bosse (1914–1996), a German-born philosopher, mathematician and economist who remained at the head of IfD for twelve years. In the first few years, research activities were limited by budget restrictions and focussed on theory and basic research as well as applied demography. From the beginning, there was an emphasis on informing the public about population issues and research results, by publications such as "Demographische Informationen" (since 1981, in German with English abstracts).

Bosse was succeeded by Richard Gisser who headed the institute 1987–1989 and again 1993–2001 (interim directorship was taken by social scientist Rainer Münz) and continues to be the institute’s deputy director and a leader of the research group on Demography of Austria.

In the period of 1985 to 2000, the institute and the research topic of demography received increasing attention, though there was some competition for scientific staff with the newly founded Max Planck Institute for Demographic Research in Rostock, Germany.

After positive independent evaluations and the commitment of special funds, the ÖAW decided to substantially expand and internationalise the institute in 2001. Under the designated new director Wolfgang Lutz, the IfD changed its name and working language, employed more scientific and administrative staff, expanded its research agenda as well as its publication efforts and moved to new and successively larger premises in the 4th district (2002–2007 at Prinz-Eugen-Strasse 8-10, then 2007–2015 at Wohllebengasse 12-14).

Research activity at VID continued to expand and received favourable attention by policy-makers and scientific peers, which showed in VID members participating in or coordinating major research projects, for instance within the European Union’s Framework Programmes, and obtaining recognition by being awarded sizeable grants from the European Research Council (ERC). Director Wolfgang Lutz received the Wittgenstein Award in 2010 and, with the 1.5 million euro prize money, established the Wittgenstein Centre for Demography and Global Human Capital.

At its 40th anniversary in 2015, VID moved to the WU campus in Vienna’s 2nd district, celebrating this and other occasions with a symposium on "Demography that Matters".

In 2016 Alexia Fürnkranz-Prskawetz, head of the Institute of Mathematical Methods in Economics at the Vienna University of Technology and long-time leader of the VID research group on Population Economics became executive director.

Research activities 

VID employs about 40 researchers, most of them from the fields of economics, mathematics/statistics, geography, health studies and sociology, to cover the major research topics of demography or population science: fertility, mortality and migration as well as a number of other fields of interest. Over time, the institute’s research focus has expanded from its core competences in Austrian and later European demography to a global perspective on the relevant issues of population and human capital development.

There are seven main areas of research, assigned to different research groups though there is considerable permeability and cooperation:

 Demography of Austria (led by Richard Gisser and Isabella Buber-Ennser)
 Comparative European Demography (Tomáš Sobotka)
 Population Dynamics and Forecasting (Sergei Scherbov)
 Population Economics (Michael Kuhn and Gustav Feichtinger)
 Health and Longevity (Marc Luy)
 Migration and Education (Jesús Crespo Cuaresma)
 Human Capital Data Lab (Anne Goujon)

Publications 

In addition to the individual contributions of VID researchers to a number of scientific journals, the institute issues the following regular publications:

 Vienna Yearbook of Population Research (VYPR)—since 2003, the "Yearbook" features peer-reviewed research articles (in English) addressing population trends as well as a broad range of theoretical and methodological issues in population research, usually taking the form of the proceedings of last year’s VID/Wittgenstein conference, which is always dedicated to a particular demographic topic. Besides that, the VYPR also publishes Demographic Debates with invited contributions on topics related to the ongoing scientific arguments in the field. Finally, contributions on Data & Trends map long-term developments as well as recent trends in various components of population change in Austria and in Europe.
 Demografische Forschung aus erster Hand—a newsletter in German language (in cooperation with the Max Planck Institute for Demographic Research), for information of journalists and policymakers in Germany, Austria and Switzerland, approx. four times a year
 VID Working Papers—occasional articles in English, mostly by VID researchers
 Forschungsberichte (Research Reports)—occasional articles, mostly in German and also usually by VID researchers
 European Demographic Data Sheet—every other year, VID presents the relevant data on a selected topic (such as ageing, migration, fertility etc.) on an A1-size poster with maps and figures

References

External links 
 Website of VID
 Online access to all volumes of the Vienna Yearbook of Population Research
 Website of Demografische Forschung aus erster Hand
 European Demographic Data Sheets, from 2006 onward

1975 establishments in Austria
Actuarial science
Austrian Academy of Sciences
Demographics
Education in Vienna
Environmental social science
Human geography
Organisations based in Vienna
Organizations established in 1975
Research institutes in Austria